Vítor Pereira may refer to:
Vítor Pereira (footballer, born 1953), Portuguese former football midfielder
Vítor Pereira (footballer, born 1968), Portuguese former football midfielder and manager
Vítor Pereira (footballer, born 1978), Portuguese former football midfielder
Vítor Pereira (footballer, born 1985), Portuguese football defender
Vítor Melo Pereira (born 1957), Portuguese former football referee